Rolf Undsæt Løvland (born 19 April 1955) is a Norwegian composer, lyricist, arranger, and pianist. Together with Fionnuala Sherry, he formed the Celtic-Nordic group Secret Garden, in which he was the composer, producer, and keyboardist. He began composing at an early age (he formed a band at the age of nine) and grew up studying at the Kristiansand Music Conservatory, later receiving his master's degree from the Norwegian Institute of Music in Oslo.

Notable songs

Løvland has won the Eurovision Song Contest twice, resulting in Norway's first two titles.  He composed the song "La det swinge" in 1985.  He also composed the song "Nocturne" in 1995, as part of the duo Secret Garden.  

In 1985 Løvland was one of the composers behind the song "Tomorrow Will Be Better" (simplified Chinese: 明天会更好; pinyin: Míngtiān huì Gènghǎo), a song directly inspired by the UK charity single "Do They Know It's Christmas?" written the previous year by Bob Geldof and Midge Ure.

He also composed the song "You Raise Me Up".  In an interview with Radio Norge in February 2010, Løvland stated that this song had been covered more than 500 times thus far.

Barbra Streisand asked Ann Hampton Callaway to write lyrics to a Rolf Løvland melody which she entitled "I've Dreamed of You", and sang to James Brolin at their wedding. The song was later recorded on her CD, "A Love Like Ours", released as a single and selected for the album, The Essential Barbra Streisand. Streisand performed this song on her live double CD, Timeless.

Awards
Spellemannsprisen (Norwegian Grammy equivalent)
Winner of the National radio chart "Song of the year-award"
Grand Prix winner of the Eurovision Song Contest twice (1985 with "La det swinge" and 1995 with "Nocturne")
Four times winner of the Norwegian selection for the Eurovision Song Contest, the Melodi Grand Prix.

References

External links
Secret Garden

1955 births
Living people
Norwegian composers
Norwegian male composers
Norwegian songwriters
Eurovision Song Contest entrants for Norway
Eurovision Song Contest entrants of 1995
Eurovision Song Contest conductors
Eurovision Song Contest winners
Melodi Grand Prix contestants
Melodi Grand Prix composers
Musicians from Kristiansand